Charles Henry Ritchie (1887–1958) was an Anglican clergyman who served in both the Church of England and the Scottish Episcopal Church.

Life 
Born on 28 May 1887, he was the youngest son of John Macfarlane Ritchie and Ella Ritchie, of Dunedin, New Zealand. He was educated at Wanganui Collegiate School, Wanganui, New Zealand; St John's College, Cambridge (B.A. 1910; M.A. 1914); and Leeds Clergy School (1910). He was ordained in the Anglican ministry as a deacon in 1911 and a priest in 1912. His first pastoral appointment was a curate at St. Michael's Church, Chester Square, London, 1911–14. In 1915, he married Marjorie Alice Stewart, youngest daughter of Sir Charles and Lady Mary Stewart. During the First World War, he served as an acting chaplain for temporary service in the Royal Navy, 1914–19. After the war, he was briefly a curate at All Saints' Church, Dunedin, New Zealand, 1920–22, before returning to England where was a curate at St Martin-in-the-Fields, London, 1922–27. He served as the Rector of St John's, Edinburgh, 1927–39, and a canon of St Mary's Cathedral, Edinburgh, 1937–39. He was then Archdeacon of Northumberland, 1939–54, and a canon of St Nicholas' Cathedral, Newcastle upon Tyne, 1939–54. Followed by as a canon of St George’s Chapel, Windsor, 1954–58. He also served as a chaplain to King George VI and then to Queen Elizabeth II, and a chaplain to Heathfield School, Ascot. He died in Polzeath, Cornwall on 8 September 1958, aged 71.

Notes

References 
 

1887 births
1958 deaths
20th-century English Anglican priests
Alumni of St John's College, Cambridge
Archdeacons of Northumberland
Canons of Windsor
People educated at Whanganui Collegiate School
20th-century Scottish Episcopalian priests